Holland & Sherry is a fabric mill founded in London in 1836 by Stephen George Holland and Frederick Sherry. It is owned by Individualized Apparel Group as of March 2003.

History

Holland & Sherry began as merchants at 10 Old Bond Street, London, specializing in woolen and silk cloths. In 1886 Holland & Sherry moved premises to Golden Square, at the time the center of the woolen merchanting trade. By 1900 the firm was exporting to many countries, it was around that time a sales office was established in New York. In the early part of the 20th century, the United Kingdom, Europe, North and South America were the dominant markets for the company. Amongst other distribution arrangements, there was a Holland & Sherry warehouse in St. Petersburg, Russia – a successful market prior to the revolution and now being successfully renewed.
By 1982 the business moved to Savile Row. Its head office is still on Savile Row. Holland & Sherry provide fabrics to tailors and couture designers throughout the world.

See also
Ermenegildo Zegna
Loro Piana
Dormeuil
Vitale Barberis Canonico
Scabal
Gladson

References

Companies based in the City of Westminster
Textile manufacturers of England
Manufacturing companies established in 1836
British companies established in 1836